Teymuraz Gongadze (born 8 September 1985 in Tbilisi) is a Georgian footballer who plays as a defender for FC Metalurgi Rustavi. He was capped for the national team on 12 August 2009 against Malta.

References

External links
 
 

1985 births
Living people
Footballers from Georgia (country)
Footballers from Tbilisi
Georgia (country) international footballers
Expatriate footballers from Georgia (country)
Expatriate footballers in Azerbaijan
FC Tbilisi players
FC Borjomi players
FC Meskheti Akhaltsikhe players
FC Metalurgi Rustavi players
Simurq PIK players
Expatriate sportspeople from Georgia (country) in Azerbaijan
FC Dinamo Tbilisi players
FC Zestafoni players
FC Dila Gori players
FC Chikhura Sachkhere players
Association football defenders